The Tainan Mosque is a mosque in East District, Tainan, Taiwan. It is the sixth mosque to be built in Taiwan.

History
Before the establishment of the mosque, Muslims around Tainan had to travel to Kaohsiung for any mosque-related activities at Kaohsiung Mosque. A land was donated by Wang Huihuan, a local Muslim living in the United States. Initially the land title was given to Taipei Grand Mosque, but then it was transferred to Kaohsiung Mosque which managed the construction of Tainan Mosque.

At the end of 1983, the fund raising of the mosque began, led by Bai Yuqi of the Kaohsiung Mosque board of chairman. Funds were raised as a specific mission listed in the construction budget book of the Tainan Mosque. As a result, Tainan Mosque was subordinated to Kaohsiung Mosque as a branch, and the imam of Tainan Mosque is often the vice imam of Kaohsiung Mosque. The fund raising lasted for over 10 years and the construction of the mosque building finally commenced in 1993. The construction was completed in September 1996.

Architecture
Tainan mosque was designed by Yan Mingguang, a National Cheng Kung University graduate from Jordan. The mosque looks like an ordinary apartment building, completely unlike a traditional mosque.

The building consists of four floors, in which they are dedicated for a shop, meeting room, ablution rooms for men and women, prayer hall and office.

Transportation
The mosque is accessible South East from Tainan Station of the Taiwan Railways.

See also
 Islam in Taiwan
 Chinese Muslim Association
 Chinese Muslim Youth League
 List of mosques in Taiwan

References

External links
 YouTube - 探訪祕境－台南清真寺 

1996 establishments in Taiwan
East District, Tainan
Mosques completed in 1996
Mosques in Taiwan
Religious buildings and structures in Tainan